gamma-Nonalactone is a chemical compound found in bourbon whiskey.

See also
 δ-Nonalactone
 Cyclotene

References

Gamma-lactones